Nannacara quadrispinae is a species of cichlid endemic to Venezuela where it is found in the Orinoco delta.  It went by the trade name Nannacara sp. Venezuela in the ornamental fish market prior to its formal description.  This species can also be found in the aquarium trade.

References

External links
 New species - Nannacara quadrispinae - Practical Fishkeeping

quadrispinae
Fish described in 2004